Helicoverpa titicacae is a species of moth of the family Noctuidae. It is found in Peru.

References

T
Moths of South America
Noctuidae of South America